Polia goliath is a moth of the family Noctuidae first described by Charles Oberthür in 1880. It is found in eastern Asia including Japan and Taiwan.

The wingspan is 50–58 mm.

References

External links 

 Discover Life
 Encyclopedia of Life

Hadenini
Moths described in 1880